Rafael Martinez may refer to:
 Rafael E. Martinez, politician
 Rafael Martínez (gymnast) (born 1983), Spanish artistic gymnast
 Rafael Martínez  Aguilera, also known as Rafa Martínez, Spanish basketball player
 Rafael Martínez Nadal (1877–1941), third president of the Senate of Puerto Rico
 Rafael Martínez Torres (born 1959), Puerto Rican jurist
 Rafael Martínez (racing driver), Mexican racing driver
 Rafael Martínez (athlete), Cuban discus thrower, see Athletics at the 1930 Central American and Caribbean Games